List of Aviation biofuel demonstration flights.

Demonstration flights

Commercial flights

References 

Alternative fuels
Aviation and the environment
Aviation fuels
Biofuels
Renewable fuels